Soy Rebelde Tour is the upcoming fifth and final tour by Mexican group RBD. The tour will have stops in North America and Latin America, starting on August 25, 2023, at the Sun Bowl Stadium in El Paso, Texas, and is set to conclude on December 17, 2023, at the Foro Sol in Mexico City. 

It will mark the group's first tour since 2008, after Gira Del Adiós took place fifteen years ago to commemorate a then-disbanding.

Background 
Following their successful virtual concert in 2020, rumors about a reunion began. On December 19, 2022, RBD's official social platforms uploaded a video captioned "Soy Rebelde!!!". The members, excluding Alfonso Herrera, changed their profile pictures to a black background with the band's logo in white. Along with the video post, a website was created that showcased a countdown and a sign-up form, along with the phrase “Prepara tu corbata, Enero 19 2023”, which translates to “Prepare your tie, January 19, 2023”.

On January 19, 2023, a 3-minute video confirming a reunion tour was displayed in public spaces in cities such as Los Angeles, New York City, Chicago, São Paulo, Rio de Janeiro and Mexico City, where fans gathered to witness the announcement. Titled Soy Rebelde Tour, it initially comprised 26 dates and was scheduled to begin on August 25, 2023, from El Paso and continue throughout the U.S, Brazil and Mexico, ending on December 2, 2023, in Mexico City. 

Due to a massive demand for concert dates in more Latin American countries, the group surprised fans in Colombia with an announcement on February 13, 2023. On the scheduled day, a concert date in Medellín was finally announced, with fans reuniting at the Provenza sector to watch the announcement via video broadcast.

Set list 
On January 23, 2023, Billboard dedicated a list of potential songs they would like to hear, in which the 2005 hit single "Sálvame" was placed at the top spot. Publications such as Forbes' The Happening, The Guardian's La Lista and Terra also elaborated their dream setlist.

One month later, the band released the single "S.H.E.A" that was originally perfomed during their 2020 livestream concert, and it features the added vocals of Dulce María, who was absent during the reunion.

Commercial performance
The announcement of the tour led to a commercial success. On January 20, a second date was added in Los Angeles, while additional dates in New York City, Chicago, Glendale, Miami, Edinburg and San Diego were added five days later. A new date in Monterrey was announced on January 27, and consequently, another one in Guadalajara on January 31. It also broke records for the most shows on a single tour at the Foro Sol, with six overall; and revenue sales in Mexico City, previously held by Bad Bunny with The World's Hottest Tour and Daddy Yankee with La Última Vuelta World Tour. 

During the presale in Brazil, all tickets available were sold under six minutes. The general sale in São Paulo was met with "overwhelming" demand, with approximately 600,000 people trying to get tickets, prompting the addition of a second and third dates.

For the initial concert in Medellín, a presale was scheduled to happen on February 15, with the general sale to ocurre two days later. However, during the presale 225,000 people attempted to purchase tickets, causing the website of eTicket Colombia to crash. On February 16 and 20, a second and third date were added, respectively. The first two dates were sold out within hours of tickets being released, while the third date being sold out in 50 minutes. On February 25, 2023, a fourth and final date in Medellín was announced. Additionally, flights and hotel room prices soared for the concert dates.

Venue records

Shows

References

2023 concert tours
RBD concert tours